St. Joseph's Commerce and Banking Historic District is a national historic district located at St. Joseph, Missouri. The district encompasses 39 contributing buildings in the central business district of St. Joseph. It developed between about 1859 and 1950, and includes representative examples of Italianate, Classical Revival, and Streamline Moderne style architecture. Located in the district are the separately listed German-American Bank Building, Corby-Forsee Building, Missouri Theater and Missouri Theater Building, and Missouri Valley Trust Company Historic District. Other notable buildings include the Ballinger Building (1889), Commerce Building (1889, 1941), First National Bank of St. Joseph (1902, 1963), Lehman's, Plymouth Building (1908), and the United Building (1917-1918) by the architecture firm of Eckel & Aldrich.

It was listed on the National Register of Historic Places in 2001.

References

Historic districts on the National Register of Historic Places in Missouri
Italianate architecture in Missouri
Neoclassical architecture in Missouri
Historic districts in St. Joseph, Missouri
National Register of Historic Places in Buchanan County, Missouri